Neermathalam is an Indian Malayalam-language horror television series directed by S Janardhanan. The show premiered on 1 May 2017 on Asianet. It stars Rebecca Santhosh in the titular role. It aired on Asianet and on-demand through Disney+ Hotstar.

Synopsis
The story revolves around a ghost, Gouri (Rebecca), who committed suicide inside the bungalow called Chandrakantham as some people tried to molest during a superstitious ritual.

Cast
 Rebecca Santhosh as Gouri
 Amala Gireesan as Ima
 Stebin Jacob as Anand

Awards and nominations

References

External links
 Official website 

Indian television series
Malayalam-language television shows
Asianet (TV channel) original programming
2017 Indian television series debuts
2017 Indian television series endings